Nikopol Municipality is a municipality (obshtina) in the northern part of Pleven Province, in northern Bulgaria. It is named after its administrative centre - the town of Nikopol.

Its northern border is by the Danube River, bordering with Turnu Măgurele municipality of Romania. The municipality also borders with Belene Municipality on the East, Livski and Pordim municipalities on the South, Pleven municipality on the Southwest and Gulyantsi Municipality on the West.

Besides the Danube, which defines the hydrography of the area, the Osam river and some minor rivers flow within the municipality.

There are plans to develop common cultural tourism program that encompass the Nikopol and Turnu Măgurele municipalities. Unlike Turnu Măgurele, Nikopol municipality has poorly developed tourism infrastructure.

Settlements 

(towns are shown in bold):

Demography 
The following table shows the change of the population during the last four decades.

Vital statistics 
The municipality of Nikopol has a low birth rate and a high death rate.

Religion 
According to the latest Bulgarian census of 2011, the religious composition, among those who answered the optional question on religious identification, was the following:

See also
Provinces of Bulgaria
Municipalities of Bulgaria
List of cities and towns in Bulgaria

References

Municipalities in Pleven Province